Ellern is an Ortsgemeinde – a municipality belonging to a Verbandsgemeinde, a kind of collective municipality – in the Rhein-Hunsrück-Kreis (district) in Rhineland-Palatinate, Germany. It belongs to the Verbandsgemeinde Simmern-Rheinböllen, whose seat is in Simmern.

Geography

Location
The municipality lies in the middle of the Hunsrück at the foot of the Soonwald (forest). Ellern lies some 10 km from the district seat of Simmern. Within quick reach is the Rhine valley with Bacharach, the Loreley, Oberwesel and Boppard.

The area within municipal limits comprises 10 km². Bordering right on Ellern's municipal limits (but within Argenthal’s) is the “Kloppwiesen” Nature Conservation Area.

Climate
Yearly precipitation in Ellern amounts to 788 mm, falling into the middle third of the precipitation chart for all Germany. At 60% of the German Weather Service's weather stations, lower figures are recorded. The driest month is September. The most rainfall comes in June. In that month, precipitation is twice what it is in September. Precipitation varies only slightly. At only 15% of the weather stations are lower seasonal swings recorded.

History
In 1347, Ellern had its first documentary mention. At the time when the church in Mörschbach was consecrated in 1006, Ellern's current location was the Wüste Elira (Wüste literally means “desert” in German). It is therefore known that Ellern's founding fell sometime between 1006 and 1347. After the time of the Reformation, Ellern became mainly Evangelical. Beginning in 1794, Ellern lay under French rule. In 1814 it was assigned to the Kingdom of Prussia at the Congress of Vienna. Since 1946, it has been part of the then newly founded state of Rhineland-Palatinate.

Population development
What follows is a table of the municipality's population figures for selected years since the early 19th century (each time at 31 December):

Politics

Municipal council
The council is made up of 12 council members, who were elected by proportional representation at the municipal election held on 7 June 2009, and the honorary mayor as chairman.

The municipal election held on 7 June 2009 yielded the following results:

Mayor
Ellern's mayor is Friedhelm Dämgen.

Coat of arms
The municipality's arms might be described thus: Argent in base a hillock with grass vert upon which a tree of the same, hanging by a riband of the same from a branch in sinister an inescutcheon quarterly, first sable a lion rampant Or, second lozengy argent and azure, third bendy lozengy of the same and fourth gules a mound banded and ensigned with a cross of the fourth.

The example shown here has a white background, which makes the edge of the shield impossible to see, but there is an escutcheon there. A further example of Ellern's arms can be seen at Heraldry of the World. This one seems to have exactly the same charges, but not quite the same tinctures, with the grassy hillock and tree being shown “proper” (that is, in their natural colours, with the tree's trunk shown in brown and the grass and leaves in green).

Town partnerships
Ellern fosters partnerships with the following places:
 Sünna, Unterbreizbach, Wartburgkreis, Thuringia

Culture and sightseeing

Buildings
The following are listed buildings or sites in Rhineland-Palatinate’s Directory of Cultural Monuments:
 Evangelical church, Simmerner Straße 7 – Classicist aisleless church, 1827-1829, architect Ferdinand Nebel, Koblenz
 Bahnhofstraße 50/52, 55 – no. 50/52: villa, partly slated, about 1910/1920, park with attendant’s house; no. 55: timber-frame commercial wing, marked 1936, administration building with hipped roof, partly timber-frame; whole complex of buildings
 Im Haferacker 4 – timber-frame Quereinhaus (a combination residential and commercial house divided for these two purposes down the middle, perpendicularly to the street), partly solid, marked 1736
 Rheinböllener Straße, Alter Friedhof (“Old Graveyard”) – warriors’ memorial, tombs, priest's tomb, about 1881, stele; Höltz tomb, stele
 Rheinböllener Straße 4 – former inn “Zur Post”; stately timber-frame Quereinhaus, plastered, hipped mansard roof, about 1800, stable/barn 19th century
 Simmerner Straße 2 – Altes Rathaus (“Old Town Hall”); building with hipped mansard roof, timber framing plastered or slated, 18th century
 Simmerner Straße 6 – bakehouse; one-floor quarrystone building, 19th century

Sport and leisure
Ellern is part of the Naturpark Soonwald-Nahe and offers a great many hiking trails and cycle paths.

Regular events
Given the wealth earned from the forest (see below), a few years ago the municipality launched the  Holzkerb, or “Wood Fair”, giving Ellern the opportunity to exhibit wood and various wooden articles in a thematized fashion. The Soonwaldfee (“Soonwald Fairy”), who is chosen on the occasion of the  Holzkerb, personifies and underscores how near the municipality is to the woods and their use. The Holzkerb is held each year on the fourth weekend in August.

Economy and infrastructure

Transport
Ellern's location is favourable for quickly reaching the Autobahn A 61, and there is a good road link to Frankfurt-Hahn Airport over Bundesstraße 50.

Earning the municipality a considerable income from the nearby forest is the local wood industry. For some 100 years, there has been a sawmill, which offers many jobs.

Energy
Ellern is home to a 46.5MW wind turbine facility simply known as Windpark Ellern. While the wind park has been controversial, it has been producing CO^2 savings enough to take out of the roads of Germany 18,000 vehicles, so it certainly is paying back the build cost.

References

External links

 Municipality’s official webpage 
 Verbandsgemeinde of Rheinböllen 

Municipalities in Rhineland-Palatinate
Rhein-Hunsrück-Kreis